William Stanley Zmitrowicz Jr. (born May 16, 1947), known professionally as Bill Smitrovich, is an American actor.

Personal life
Smitrovich was born in Bridgeport, Connecticut, the son of Anna (née Wojna) and Stanley William Zmitrowicz, a tool and die maker. He is of Polish descent. Bill is a graduate of the University of Bridgeport (1972) and holds an MFA from Smith College (1976). He is married to Shaw Purnell from Pittsburgh, Pennsylvania. They have a son, Alexander John, and a daughter Maya Christina, four years younger.

Career
Smitrovich has starred in a number of television series.  His first prominent TV series role was in the 1980s series Crime Story as Det. Sgt. Danny Krychek. He went on to star in the  hit drama series Life Goes On (1989–93). Smitrovich was the lead guest star in the pilot film of the 1980s crime drama hit series Miami Vice.  He also appeared in the final episode of NYPD Blue. He has also been seen in The Henry Lee Project with Danny Glover. In 1996, Smitrovich was cast as Seattle police lieutenant Bob Bletcher in Millennium, created and produced by Chris Carter, the creator of The X-Files. He is perhaps best known for his roles on the A&E series A Nero Wolfe Mystery (based on the Nero Wolfe detective stories by Rex Stout) as Inspector Cramer, and on the ABC hit series The Practice as Assistant District Attorney Kenneth Walsh and then went on to Without a Trace, where he played the recurring character of Chief Alex Olcyk.  In 2010 he starred in the NBC series The Event as Vice President Raymond Jarvis.

Smitrovich has also played a number of characters in military roles. These include Independence Day (1996), Air Force One (1997), Thirteen Days (2000), Fail Safe (2000), and Eagle Eye (2008).

He has made many guest appearances on various television shows. His best-known appearances include the two-part Star Trek: Deep Space Nine third-season episode "Past Tense," 24, Numb3rs, NYPD Blue, Touched by an Angel, Law & Order: Special Victims Unit, Criminal Minds, Castle, and the Dynasty reboot.

Smitrovich has also starred in several television movies, playing Alexander Haig in the 2003 biographical TV miniseries The Reagans, as well as filling roles in Futuresport (1998) and in The '60s miniseries (1999). On film, Smitrovich's roles include the Stephen King adaptation Silver Bullet (1985),  Renegades (1989), The Trigger Effect (1996), Gridiron Gang (2006), and the Marvel Comics superhero movie Iron Man (2008).

Bill played the role of Mr. Zimburger in the Johnny Depp film The Rum Diary. He also appeared as the head of the CIA, Hanley, in Pierce Brosnan's movie The November Man.

Selected filmography

Muggable Mary, Street Cop (1982, TV movie) - Charlie Hock
A Little Sex (1982) – Technician
Without a Trace (1983) – Police officer
Splash (1984) – Ralph Bauer
Maria's Lovers (1984) – Bartender
Key Exchange (1985) – Lenny
Silver Bullet (1985) – Andy Fairton
The Beniker Gang (1985) – Laundry Truck Driver
A Killing Affair (1986) – Pink Gresham
Band of the Hand (1986) – Chavez
Manhunter (1986) – Lloyd Bowman
Her Alibi (1989) – Farrell
Renegades (1989) – Finch
Cяazy People (1990) – Bruce
Bodily Harm (1995) – Lt. Darryl Stewart
Nick of Time (1995) – Officer Trust
The Phantom (1996) – Uncle Dave Palmer
Independence Day (1996) – Captain Watson
The Trigger Effect (1996) – Steph
Ghosts of Mississippi (1996) – Jim Kitchens
Air Force One (1997) – General William Northwood
Around the Fire (1998) – Matt Harris
Futuresport (1998) - Coach Douglas
Fail Safe (2000) (TV) – Gen. Stark
Thirteen Days (2000) – General Maxwell Taylor
A Nero Wolfe Mystery (2001–2002) (TV) – Inspector Cramer
The Reagans (2003) (TV) – Alexander Haig
The Game of Their Lives (2005) – Admiral Higgins
Heavens Fall (2006) – George Chamlee
Gridiron Gang (2006) – Wainwright
The Last Lullaby (2008) – Martin
Iron Man (2008) – General Gabriel
Flash of Genius (2008) – Judge Franks 
Eagle Eye (2008) – Admiral Thompson
Seven Pounds (2008) – George Ristuccia
The Rum Diary (2011) – Mr. Zimburger
Ted (2012) – Frank
The November Man (2014) – Hanley
Ted 2 (2015) – Frank
Two And A Half Men (2015) – Rick
Grey's Anatomy (2016) – Therapist
Bitch (2017)
Dynasty (2017–2018) – Thomas Carrington (3 episodes)

References

External links
 
 

1947 births
Living people
American male film actors
American male television actors
American male voice actors
Male actors from Bridgeport, Connecticut
University of Bridgeport alumni
American people of Polish descent
20th-century American male actors
21st-century American male actors
Smith College alumni